HMAS Reserve was a tugboat operated by the Royal Australian Navy (RAN) between 1943 and 1953.

Construction
She was built by the Levingston Shipbuilding Company, Orange, Texas during 1942.

Operational history
Reserve was acquired by the Australian Commonwealth Marine Salvage Board on 10 December 1942. She was commissioned into the RAN on 17 August 1943 and served off eastern Australia and in the South West Pacific. During late 1943 and 1944, she participated in the Allied landings at Cape Gloucester, the Admiralty Islands, Saidor, Hollandia, Wakde, Leyte and Mindoro.

The ship received the battle honour 'New Guinea 1943-44" for her wartime service.

Decommissioning and fate

Reserve remained in service with the RAN until 19 October 1953 when she was decommissioned. She was subsequently sold on 21 September 1961.

Sold to Filipino interests, she was renamed Polaris. She was used in an ill-fated attempt to tow 4 vessels from Newcastle to Manila, being former Sydney ferries, (Kalang, Koondooloo and Kooroongabba and former Hobart vessel, Lurgerena).  Kooroongabba sank, and the other three vessels beached themselves at Trial Bay while Polaris was at anchor for repairs. The tug tried to remove the old ferries, but they remained fast. Their timber superstructures were broken up by the waves, and their rusted steel structures remain in the sands of the beach. Defeated, Polaris returned to the Philippines.

References

Favourite-class tugboats of the Royal Australian Navy
Ships built in Orange, Texas
1942 ships